Czerep  (ger. Todten Kopf, Todtenkopf, 581 m a.s.l.) – a hill in the southern part of the Krzeszowskie Wzgórza, within Kotlina Kamiennogórska, in Central Sudetes.

Position 
The peak is located in the southern part of the Krzeszowskie Wzgórza; it is their southern tip. In the north, through Przełęcz Żłób it connects to the Post Berg. Southern slopes steeply fall into the stream Kochanówka that separates Krzeszowskie Wzgórza of Zawory Mountains.

The geologic structure 
It is made from Credaceus sandstones glauconite and mudstones.

Vegetation 
The apex as well as the majority of hill are covered with a pine forest, down, east and west sides feature meadows.

Bibliography 
 Słownik geografii turystycznej Sudetów, tom 8 Kotlina Kamiennogórska, Wzgórza Bramy Lubawskiej, Zawory, red. Marek Staffa, Wydawnictwo I-BiS, Wrocław 1997, s. 89 i 90
 Sudety Środkowe.  Skala 1:40000. Jelenia Góra: Wydawnictwo Turystyczne Plan, 2005. .

Mountain peaks of the Krzeszowskie Wzgórza